José Maria dos Santos Motta (born May 27, 1939), commonly known as Zé Maria, is a former Brazilian soccer player who played in the NASL.

Career statistics

Club

Notes

References

Living people
Brazilian footballers
Brazilian expatriate footballers
Association football defenders
Fluminense FC players
Botafogo de Futebol e Regatas players
Bonsucesso Futebol Clube players
Clube Náutico Capibaribe players
Olaria Atlético Clube players
Sport Club Internacional players
Baltimore Bays players
Washington Whips players
National Professional Soccer League (1967) players
North American Soccer League (1968–1984) players
Expatriate soccer players in the United States
Brazilian expatriate sportspeople in the United States
1939 births
Sportspeople from Piauí